Millions Now Living Will Never Die is the second studio album by American post-rock band Tortoise. The album was released on  January 30, 1996 by Thrill Jockey.

The album's title is a reference to a phrase used in the Jehovah's Witness faith in the 1920s. It is, for instance, the title of an essay by Joseph Franklin Rutherford, who was the second president of the Watch Tower Bible and Tract Society. It was also the slogan of the evangelist Aimee Semple McPherson.

By March 1998, the album had sold over 50,000 copies, with 80% as CDs and the remainder as LPs.

Reception

Millions Now Living Will Never Die was released to positive critical reviews, and it has since been renowned as a groundbreaking album for the post-rock genre. Outersound wrote that not long after the album's release, the group was "hailed as godfathers of the American 'post-rock' movement". The Wire named it the record of the year in its annual critics' poll and NME named it the 35th best album of 1996.

In 2006 and 2008, Millions Now Living Will Never Die was performed live in its entirety as part of the All Tomorrow's Parties-curated Don't Look Back concert series. The album also appears in the book 1001 Albums You Must Hear Before You Die.

Track listing

Personnel
Credits for Millions Now Living Will Never Die adapted from album liner notes.

Tortoise
Dan Bitney
John Herndon
Douglas McCombs
John McEntire
David Pajo

Production
John McEntire – mixing, recording
Roger Seibel – mastering

Artwork and design
Dan Osborn – layout assistance, "computer magic"
Tortoise – sleeve design

Samples 
The song "Dear Grandma and Grandpa" contains a sample of German band Dom's song "Silence", from their 1972 album Edge of Time.

Charts

References

External links 
 
 A.D. Amorosi: "The Making of Tortoise's Millions Now Living Will Never Die" (magnetmagazine.com, 2016-02-23)

Tortoise (band) albums
1996 albums
Thrill Jockey albums
Instrumental rock albums